Chris Mee Safety Engineering, now known as 'CMSE, is a specialist in environmental, safety and energy consultancy and training services. The company is retained by organisations in Ireland and the UK to ensure compliance, minimise risk and upskill management and staff.

CMSE was founded in 1996 in Cork, Ireland. It has centres in Dublin and Cork and a fire training facility in Cork Harbour. 

CMSE and the Canadian Standards Association (CSA) collaborated in early 2009 to allow CMSE to exclusively deliver CSA Greenhouse Gas (GHG) Management Training Programmes in Ireland and the UK.

References 

Companies of the Republic of Ireland